The San Diego Creek bicycle path is an important cycling route of the city of Irvine, California, which runs through it. The path connects major points such as Newport Beach, University of California, Irvine, Boomers Irvine, Colonel Bill Barber Park, Irvine Civic Center, Irvine Crossroads shopping center, Woodbridge High School in Irvine, Woodbridge Community Park, Atria Senior Residential Area, Windrow Community Park and Irvine Medical Complex, before finally reaching Irvine Spectrum Center. It also runs through the majority of Irvine's neighborhoods such as Westpark, Woodbridge, and Oak Creek. The path begins where the San Diego Creek empties into Upper Newport Bay. The Bay itself makes for a pleasant ride with a marked bike lane on the road on the Eastern shore along a quiet road, some busy streets in the South and a section of separate path for bikes and pedestrians to the east.

Main trail

One entry point is Bayview Way, which is just off Jamboree Road between route 73 and the bridge over San Diego creek. Riders can enter the path here and proceed North back to Jamboree Road and then East across the bridge, then take the ramp under the bridge.

Heading North, the path passes through a wetlands area until it parallels University Drive with University of California Irvine on the opposite side. Access is continuous along this stretch, although public parking is not.

University Drive veers East and the path and creek continue due North, with the wetlands giving way to a concrete-bottom storm drain. The path passes under Main Street and Alton Parkway, each of which includes an access ramp. Ultimately the path reaches a fork in the creek near Colonel Barber park, which has excellent public restrooms and water available. The path crosses to the opposite side on a bridge and continues on the Eastern branch of the creek, leading under more underpasses with street access at Harvard Avenue and Culver Drive.

From here the path passes through the residential center of Irvine, with town houses, more municipal parks and a lawn-like slope around the creek. There are several at-grade crossings of relatively quiet avenues. At one point, there is another bridge that crosses the creek and is part of another bike trail that runs perpendicular to the creek trail, running through the central park of Irvine and frequented by a large number of pedestrians.

The creek path continues to the East and culminates in a landscaped section that includes two short bike tunnels as it passes through Windrow Park. The last tunnel emerges on the East side of Jeffrey Road without clear signage. Making a sharp left curve, the trail runs concurrently south with Jeffrey Road to the car bridge over the creek, where there is an entrance to the continuation of the path separating from Jeffrey Road. The path runs past the Oak Creek community until it reaches the Irvine Medical Complex and the industrial park outskirts of Irvine, crossing under Sand Canyon Avenue and Laguna Canyon Road. The path continues for a short stretch on the South side of the creek and dead-ends. It is possible to cross over to the North side of the creek and continue to the Highway 133 underpass, and emerge into the Irvine Spectrum Center.

Alternate return path
There is an alternate return path that includes Class 2 bike lanes, a Class 1 path through the hills above Irvine, and a Class 1 path built as part of the planned subdivisions of older Irvine. Access is South on Old Laguna (Road?), which leads through quiet industrial park areas to a bridge over Interstate 405, and on to an area of newly developed town homes all on relatively safe Class 2 bike lanes (with the possible exception of a narrow bridge). Turning right at Quail Hill Parkway leads to a traffic circle; to the left at the circle, uphill, is the start of the new Class 1 path.

The Class 1 path begins on a very long uphill stretch, followed by a long pleasant downhill ride through a pretty canyon area, part of an affluent land development named Shady Canyon. Ultimately the path leads to an entrance guard house, and continues to the left on a section of Class I path (not documented here). Taking the sidewalk to the right of the guard house leads back to surface roads. Taking the first right on Sunnyhill (Road?) leads to a crossing into a small park, where there is a sidewalk / bike path that heads back uphill. This ends on a downhill street which leads to an intersection. Turning left at the intersection and using the sidewalk, which doubles as a bike path, leads downhill to the entrance to another Class 1 bike path, which snakes downhill on a narrow greenway passing under streets in special tunnels, reminiscent of a roller coaster ride. Caution is warranted, as this is in a residential section and there are pedestrians and dogs. Riders may also find it helpful to carry a map of this section of Irvine, since there is no signage for this part of the path and the first gap in the greenway can be confusing.

At the base of the hill the path emerges into a wetlands area along University Drive:
A right turn leads back north to Interstate 405, which has a recently completed section of Class 1 trail that crosses I405 to Jeffrey Road, which intersects San Diego Creek some distance to the north of I405.
A left turn leads south through the wetlands crossing Culver Drive at grade, into another municipal park. The dedicated Class I path continues ending at a diagonal crossing of Harvard Avenue. In a very short distance, behind the Evangelical Church, is one of the ramp entrances to the creek path. Turning left here leads back south to Newport Bay and the end of the San Diego Creek Path.

Peters Canyon branch

Peters Canyon bike trail is a medium length Class I facility that branches from the San Diego Creek trail in Irvine. Though not yet 100% complete, it is possible to make a 100% Class 1 trip from San Diego Creek to the terminus of the trail in Peters Canyon.

The first section is actually a detour that begins at the corner of Barranca Pkwy and Harvard Ave. Cyclists coming up the San Diego trail from the south will note the branch between the channel of the San Diego Creek and Peters Canyon Wash. This is soon followed by the trail crossing the San Diego on a small bridge, and finally the Harvard Ave underpass. After going through the underpass exit onto Harvard Ave. The detour for Peters Canyon is north on Harvard. Cyclists have two options. There is a Class I trail on the East side of Harvard that resembles a sidewalk. It does not have any signs marking it as a bike path, but the Irvine Bikeways maps shows it as such. The alternative is a high-quality Class II trail running alongside on Harvard Avenue.

After several at grade street crossings the trail arrives at the railroad tracks just north of Edinger Ave. There is a Class I trail to the right before the tracks which proceeds northeast toward Sand Canyon Ave. To continue on Peters Canyon cross the tracks and pick up the Class I bike trail to the left, crossing Harvard Ave. (Take care here as there is no traffic light.)

This trail parallels the railroad for a short distance before turning sharply right parallel to Peters Canyon Wash. The trail along the wash used to terminate near the 5 freeway and there is still a sign warning that the trail terminates. However, the trail is now open. The trail actually descends into the wash under the 5 with the water in the wash restricted to a narrow concrete ditch that is part of the concrete block comprising the trail. Needless to say, this trail will be very sensitive to rain event closures.

Rising back out of the wash, the trail reaches Bryan Ave. Taking the underpass, the cyclist should make a hairpin right onto the Bryan Ave exit ramp. A Class I trail does continue on the East side of the wash and includes several branches to the East into Irvine. However, the Peters Canyon trail crosses the wash and the 261 Freeway to the West on the overpass which has a dedicated Class I facility. Turning right, the Peters Canyon trail continues on the West side of the wash. You will note that there is a future provision here for the trail to continue South on the West side of the wash. Indeed, between this point and the railroad tracks the observant cyclist will have noted several completed and uncompleted sections on the opposite side of the wash. Traveling North the Peters Canyon trail runs parallel to an equestrian trail. From this point on, wherever the signs are insufficient to determine the direction of the trail, as occurs in one or two spots, the cyclist may use the equestrian trail as a guide.

The trail follows the wash and the 261 for a short distance until passing under Irvine Ave in a tunnel. It then turns West winding its way through a condominium community ultimately emerging alongside Jamboree Rd. Traveling gently up hill there are several at grade street crossings until the trail enters a park and then turns under Jamboree Rd to emerge on the other side. Some more at grade crossings are encountered until the trail turns West and North winding its way toward Peters Canyon Park finally entering the park terminating near the Lower Peters Canyon Reservoir.

Combined with the San Diego Creek trail, starting at Newport Bay the total distance to Peters Canyon Park is approximately 15 miles and has a vertical rise of about 350 feet. The trail is fully Class I except for at grade street crossings and in excellent condition. There are signs and stencils on the San Diego Creek trail and the Peters Canyon trail marking them both collectively as 'Mountains to Sea Trail'.

See also
Jeffrey Open Space Trail
List of San Diego bike paths
List of Orange County bike paths
List of Los Angeles bike paths

External links
City of Irvine Bikeways Page (maps)

Bike paths in Orange County, California
Geography of Irvine, California